Drag Heals is a Canadian reality television series, which premiered in 2018 on OutTV. Created and hosted by Tracey Erin Smith, co-hosted by Dale Edwards (aka Vicki Lix), directed by Charlie David, and produced by Border2Border, the series centres on a group of aspiring drag performers learning the craft in Canada's only "drag school" program. The participants work with Smith and weekly guest coaches to learn the process and craft of drag performance, before giving their own debut performances in a group drag show at Toronto's Buddies in Bad Times theatre.

The series includes both drag queens and drag kings. It grew out of Smith's existing drag training programs, Dude for a Day and Project Drag Queen.

The series premiered on OutTV in 2018. A second season went into production in 2019, and is slated to air in 2020.

References

External links

Drag (clothing) television shows
2018 Canadian television series debuts
2010s Canadian LGBT-related television series
2010s Canadian reality television series
2020s Canadian LGBT-related television series
2020s Canadian reality television series
OutTV (Canadian TV channel) original programming
2010s LGBT-related reality television series
2020s LGBT-related reality television series
Canadian LGBT-related reality television series